The 2003 NASCAR Busch Series began February 15 and ended November 15. Brian Vickers of Hendrick Motorsports won the championship.

2003 teams and drivers

Full schedule

Limited schedule

Races

Koolerz 300

The Koolerz 300 was held on February 15 at Daytona International Speedway.  Joe Nemechek won the pole but was suffering from the flu, so Jeff Green started the car from the rear of the field.

Top ten results

8–Dale Earnhardt Jr.
17–Matt Kenseth
21–Kevin Harvick
4–Mike Wallace
1–Jamie McMurray
92–Todd Bodine
25–Bobby Hamilton Jr.
38–Kasey Kahne
43–Johnny Sauter
27–Chase Montgomery

Failed to qualify: Mark Day (#81), Jay Sauter (#75), C. W. Smith (#67), Joe Buford (#84), Brad Teague (#52), Larry Hollenbeck (#82), Ron Barfield (#91)

Rockingham 200

The Rockingham 200 was scheduled for February 22, but rain pushed it back to February 24 at North Carolina Speedway. David Green won the pole.

Top ten results

1–Jamie McMurray
37–David Green
92–Todd Bodine
7–Randy LaJoie
57–Jason Keller
20–Mike Bliss
26–Kevin Grubb
5–Brian Vickers
43–Johnny Sauter
21–Kevin Harvick

Failed to qualify: Justin Ashburn (#61), Michael Dokken (#72), Jeff Fultz (#86)

Sam's Town 300

The Sam's Town 300 was held on March 1 at Las Vegas Motor Speedway. Stanton Barrett won the pole.

Top ten results

87–Joe Nemechek
21–Kevin Harvick
20–Mike Bliss
8–Steve Park
57–Jason Keller
37–David Green
99–Michael Waltrip
60–Stanton Barrett
2–Ron Hornaday Jr.
23–Scott Wimmer

Failed to qualify: Steadman Marlin (#30), Wayne Jacks (#52), Troy Cline (#0), Mike McLaughlin (#01), Morgan Shepherd (#00), Scott Lynch (#08)

darlingtonraceway.com 200

The darlingtonraceway.com 200 was scheduled for March 15 but instead held on March 17 at Darlington Raceway due to rain. Stanton Barrett won the pole as the field was set by 2002 Busch Series owner points due to said rain.

Top ten results

92–Todd Bodine
1–Jamie McMurray
10–Scott Riggs
59–Stacy Compton
21–Johnny Sauter
27–Hank Parker Jr.
5–Brian Vickers
38–Kasey Kahne
2–Ron Hornaday Jr.
57–Jason Keller

Failed to qualify: none

Final Busch Series win for Todd Bodine
The end of the race was wild as Jamie McMurray slipped past Todd Bodine for the top spot on the last turn of the last lap, the two banged fenders and McMurray was spun as Bodine took the checkers. The day before, the closest finish in NASCAR Winston Cup Series history happened.

Channellock 250

The Channellock 250 was held on March 22 at Bristol Motor Speedway. David Green won the pole.

Top ten results

21–Kevin Harvick
33–Tony Raines
57–Jason Keller
37–David Green
20–Mike Bliss
25–Bobby Hamilton Jr.
48–Shane Hmiel
7–Randy LaJoie
92–Todd Bodine
43–Johnny Sauter

Failed to qualify: none

O'Reilly 300

The O'Reilly 300 was held on March 29 at Texas Motor Speedway. Jason Keller won the pole.

Top ten results

87–Joe Nemechek
10–Scott Riggs
48–Shane Hmiel
19–Chad Blount
82–Jimmy Spencer
17–Matt Kenseth
23–Scott Wimmer
38–Kasey Kahne
10–Coy Gibbs

Failed to qualify: Troy Cline (#00), Robby Benton (#85)

Chad Blount received a 25–point penalty for illegal modifications to his car's rear hubs found after the race.

Aaron's 312 (Talladega)

The Aaron's 312 was held on April 5 at Talladega Superspeedway. Joe Nemechek won the pole.

Top ten results

8–Dale Earnhardt Jr.
87–Joe Nemechek
48–Shane Hmiel
2–Ron Hornaday Jr.
20–Mike Bliss
1–Jamie McMurray
99–Michael Waltrip
4–Mike Wallace
18–Coy Gibbs
22–Tina Gordon

Failed to qualify: Bobby Gerhart (#55), Kevin Ray (#95), Gus Wasson (#84)

This race was Lyndon Amick's last career start.

Pepsi 300

The Pepsi 300 was held on April 12 at Nashville Superspeedway. Randy LaJoie won the pole.

Top ten results

37–David Green
21–Johnny Sauter
46–Ashton Lewis
20–Mike Bliss
87–David Reutimann
60–Stanton Barrett
1–David Stremme
19–Chad Blount
5–Brian Vickers
25–Bobby Hamilton Jr.

Failed to qualify: John Hayden (#85), Jeff Streeter (#83), Joe Buford (#8), Dion Ciccarelli (#04), Norm Benning (#84), Gus Wasson (#96)

1–800–Pitshop.com 300

The 1–800–Pitshop.com 300 was held on April 26 at California Speedway. Kevin Harvick won the pole.

Top ten results

17–Matt Kenseth
99–Michael Waltrip
21–Kevin Harvick
38–Kasey Kahne
92–Todd Bodine
1–Jamie McMurray
57–Jason Keller
48–Shane Hmiel
37–David Green

Failed to qualify: Jason Hedlesky (#91), Brad Teague (#52), Greg Pursley (#84)

Hardee's 250

The Hardee's 250 was held on May 2 at Richmond International Raceway. Michael Waltrip won the pole.

Top ten results

21–Kevin Harvick
10–Scott Riggs
33–Tony Raines
99–Michael Waltrip
23–Scott Wimmer
43–Johnny Sauter
59–Stacy Compton
48–Shane Hmiel
37–David Green
25–Bobby Hamilton Jr.

Failed to qualify: Brad Baker (#28), Kenny Hendrick (#91), Justin Ashburn (#61), Randy MacDonald (#72), Dion Ciccarelli (#84), Jason Rudd (#01)

Charter Pipeline 250

The Charter Pipeline 250 was held on May 10 at Gateway International Raceway. Ashton Lewis won the pole.

Top ten results

10–Scott Riggs
37–David Green
57–Jason Keller
5–Brian Vickers
25–Bobby Hamilton Jr.
59–Stacy Compton
21–Johnny Sauter
23–Scott Wimmer
60–Stanton Barrett
99–Kenny Wallace

Failed to qualify: none

Goulds Pumps/ITT Industries 200

The Goulds Pumps/ITT Industries 200  was held on May 18 at Nazareth Speedway. Randy LaJoie won the pole.

Top ten results

2–Ron Hornaday Jr.
5–Brian Vickers
20–Mike Bliss
37–David Green
92–Todd Bodine
1–David Stremme
7–Randy LaJoie
59–Stacy Compton
25–Bobby Hamilton Jr.
21–Johnny Sauter

Failed to qualify: Brian Conz (#70)

Carquest Auto Parts 300

The Carquest Auto Parts 300 was held on May 24 at Lowe's Motor Speedway. Kevin Harvick won the pole.

Top ten results

17–Matt Kenseth
87–Kyle Busch
10–Scott Riggs
92–Todd Bodine
20–Mike Bliss
38–Kasey Kahne
8–Hank Parker Jr.
46–Ashton Lewis
21–Kevin Harvick
99–Michael Waltrip

Failed to qualify: Casey Atwood (#82), Morgan Shepherd (#0), Lance Norick (#90), Brad Baker(#39), Jason Schuler (#73), Kenny Hendrick (#91)

Kyle Busch made his first Busch series start, and surprised many by finishing 2nd to race winner Matt Kenseth.

MBNA Armed Forces Family 200

The MBNA Armed Forces Family 200 was held on May 31 at Dover International Speedway. Joe Nemechek won the pole.

Top ten results

87–Joe Nemechek
10–Scott Riggs
37–David Green
17–Matt Kenseth
5–Brian Vickers
25–Bobby Hamilton Jr.
92–Todd Bodine
38–Kasey Kahne
20–Mike Bliss
2–Ron Hornaday Jr.

Failed to qualify: Gus Wasson (#96), Brian Weber (#84)

Trace Adkins Chrome 300

The Trace Adkins Chrome 300 was held on June 7 at Nashville Superspeedway. Johnny Sauter won the pole.

Top ten results

10–Scott Riggs
37–David Green
1–David Stremme
7–Randy LaJoie
25–Bobby Hamilton Jr.
46–Ashton Lewis
60–Stanton Barrett
23–Scott Wimmer
75–Jay Sauter
5–Brian Vickers

Failed to qualify: Brian Weber (#84)

This was Scott Riggs’ final Busch Series win.

Meijer 300 presented by Oreo Happy

The Meijer 300 presented by Oreo Happy was held on June 14 at Kentucky Speedway. Stacy Compton won the pole.

Top ten results

25–Bobby Hamilton Jr.
57–Jason Keller
2–Ron Hornaday Jr.
59–Stacy Compton
5–Brian Vickers
46–Ashton Lewis
27–David Green
14–Casey Atwood
1–David Stremme

Failed to qualify: Jason Rudd (#01), Rick Markle (#68), Jamie Mosley (#39), Justin Ashburn (#61), Stan Boyd (#72), Mike Potter (#52), John Hayden (#85)

GNC Live Well 250

The GNC Live Well 250 was held on June 29 at The Milwaukee Mile. Johnny Sauter won the pole.

Top ten results

57–Jason Keller
5–Brian Vickers
1–David Stremme
2–Ron Hornaday Jr.
87–David Reutimann
37–David Green
10–Scott Riggs
92–Todd Bodine
59–Stacy Compton
25–Bobby Hamilton Jr.

This was Jason Keller's last career NASCAR victory.

Failed to qualify: none

Winn-Dixie 250

The Winn-Dixie 250 was held on July 4 at Daytona International Speedway. Dale Earnhardt Jr. won the pole.

Top ten results

8–Dale Earnhardt Jr.
99–Michael Waltrip
1–Jamie McMurray
2–Ron Hornaday Jr.
21–Johnny Sauter
10–Scott Riggs
5–Brian Vickers
92–Todd Bodine
34–Mike McLaughlin
48–Shane Hmiel

Failed to qualify: Jason Schuler (#73), Joe Aramendia (#79), Dan Pardus (#39), Jimmy Kitchens (#70), Jason Hedlesky (#91)

In addition to winning the pole, Earnhardt Jr would lead all 100 laps to win his third superspeedway race of the season.
Earnhardt Jr’s win marked a season sweep for DEI in the Busch Series restrictor plate races as well as DEI’s 5th straight restrictor plate win across NASCAR as a whole.

Tropicana Twister 300

The Tropicana Twister 300 was held on July 12 at Chicagoland Speedway. Casey Mears won the pole.

Top ten results

25–Bobby Hamilton Jr.
17–Matt Kenseth
5–Brian Vickers
19–Casey Mears
99–Michael Waltrip
57–Jason Keller
10–Scott Riggs
33–Tony Raines
1–Jamie McMurray
20–Mike Bliss

Failed to qualify: none

New England 200

The New England 200 was held on July 19 at New Hampshire International Speedway. Kevin Harvick won the pole.

Top ten results

37–David Green
21–Kevin Harvick
17–Matt Kenseth
5–Brian Vickers
23–Scott Wimmer
25–Bobby Hamilton Jr.
57–Jason Keller
2–Ron Hornaday Jr.
38–Kasey Kahne
59–Stacy Compton

Failed to qualify: none

TrimSpa Dream Body 250

The TrimSpa Dream Body 250 was held on July 26 at Pikes Peak International Raceway. Bobby Hamilton Jr. won the pole.

Top ten results

23–Scott Wimmer
57–Jason Keller
10–Scott Riggs
21–Johnny Sauter
27–Joey Clanton
59–Stacy Compton
2–Ron Hornaday Jr.
26–Kevin Grubb
46–Ashton Lewis
38–Kasey Kahne

Failed to qualify: Drew White (#28)

Kroger 200

The Kroger 200 was held on August 2 at Indianapolis Raceway Park. Shane Hmiel won the pole.

Top ten results

5–Brian Vickers
57–Jason Keller
59–Stacy Compton
48–Shane Hmiel
10–Scott Riggs
37–David Green
7–Mike Skinner
2–Ron Hornaday Jr.
55–Paul Menard
20–Mike Bliss

Failed to qualify: Norm Benning (#84), Brett Oakley (#07), Bill Hoff (#93)

Cabela's 250

The Cabela's 250 was held on August 16 at Michigan International Speedway. Kasey Kahne won the pole. The race was shortened to 110 laps due to rain.

Top ten results

21–Kevin Harvick
38–Kasey Kahne
25–Bobby Hamilton Jr.
37–David Green
10–Scott Riggs
87–David Reutimann
19–Casey Mears
99–Michael Waltrip
48–Shane Hmiel
31–Dave Blaney

Failed to qualify: Rick Markle (#68), Justin Ashburn (#61), Larry Hollenbeck (#62), Mike Potter (#52)

Food City 250

The Food City 250 was held on August 22 at Bristol Motor Speedway. Jason Keller won the pole.

Top ten results

99–Michael Waltrip
2–Ron Hornaday Jr.
6–Ted Musgrave
48–Shane Hmiel
21–Kevin Harvick
81–Martin Truex Jr.
5–Brian Vickers
33–Tony Raines
10–Scott Riggs
46–Ashton Lewis

Failed to qualify: Caleb Holman (#78), Justin Ashburn (#60), John Hayden (#85), Jason White (#70), Dion Ciccarelli (#84), Butch Jarvis (#53), Brett Oakley (#07), Norm Benning (#8), Daniel Johnson (#94)

Winn-Dixie 200 presented by PepsiCo

The Winn-Dixie 200 presented by PepsiCo was held on August 30 at Darlington Raceway. Kevin Harvick won the pole.

Top ten results

5–Brian Vickers
87–Kyle Busch
99–Michael Waltrip
25–Bobby Hamilton Jr.
21–Kevin Harvick
38–Kasey Kahne
57–Jason Keller
59–Stacy Compton
19–Casey Mears
14–Casey Atwood

Failed to qualify: (#94)Kenny Hendrick (#97)Jimmy Kitchens(#91)Dan Pardus

Funai 250

The Funai 250 was held on September 5 at Richmond International Raceway. Kevin Harvick won the pole.

Top ten results

43–Johnny Sauter
21–Kevin Harvick
25–Bobby Hamilton Jr.
5–Brian Vickers
37–David Green
17–Matt Kenseth
2–Ron Hornaday Jr.
33–Tony Raines
31–Dave Blaney
48–Shane Hmiel

Failed to qualify: Dion Ciccarelli (#84), Jimmy Kitchens (#91), Paul Menard (#55), Kenny Hendrick (#94), Franklin Butler (#13), Morgan Shepherd (#89), Hermie Sadler (#02), Jimmy Henderson (#63)

Stacker 200 presented by YJ Stinger

The Stacker 200 presented by YJ Stinger was held on September 20 at Dover International Speedway. Kevin Harvick won the pole.

Top ten results

5–Brian Vickers
25–Bobby Hamilton Jr.
10–Scott Riggs
38–Kasey Kahne
20–Mike Bliss
2–Ron Hornaday Jr.
46–Ashton Lewis
57–Jason Keller
21–Kevin Harvick
4–Mike Wallace

Failed to qualify: Kenny Hendrick (#94), Jeff Streeter (#83), Martin Truex Jr. (#81), Jason Rudd (#01), Morgan Shepherd (#89), Jimmy Henderson (#63), Jimmy Kitchens (#41)

Mr. Goodcents 300

The Mr. Goodcents 300 was held on October 4 at Kansas Speedway. Michael Waltrip won the pole.

Top ten results

37–David Green
21–Kevin Harvick
7–Greg Biffle
57–Jason Keller
8–Hank Parker Jr.
46–Ashton Lewis
23–Scott Wimmer
59–Stacy Compton
87–Joe Nemechek
1–Jamie McMurray

Failed to qualify: Morgan Shepherd (#9), Ron Young (#71), Jeff Streeter (#83), John Hayden (#85), Stanton Barrett (#91), Justin Ashburn (#61), Jamie Mosley (#39)

This race was the last win for Pontiac in the Busch Series, and in any of the top two divisions of NASCAR altogether.

Little Trees 300

The Little Trees 300 was held on October 11 after rain postponed it from October 10 at Lowe's Motor Speedway. Kevin Harvick won the pole.

Top ten results

7–Greg Biffle
99–Michael Waltrip
20–Mike Bliss
5–Brian Vickers
1–Jamie McMurray
37–David Green
25–Bobby Hamilton Jr.
38–Kasey Kahne
21–Kevin Harvick
57–Jason Keller

Failed to qualify: Jeff Streeter (#22), Shane Hall (#15), Wayne Anderson (#35), Justin Ashburn (#61), Mike Harmon (#44), Jamie Mosley (#39), Brad Teague (#52), Gus Wasson (#70)

Sam's Town 250

The Sam's Town 250 was held on October 18 at Memphis Motorsports Park. David Reutimann won the pole.

Top ten results

25–Bobby Hamilton Jr.
57–Jason Keller
21–Johnny Sauter
2–Ron Hornaday Jr.
5–Brian Vickers
23–Scott Wimmer
14–Casey Atwood
20–Mike Bliss
1–David Stremme
46–Ashton Lewis

Failed to qualify: John Hayden (#85), Justin Ashburn (#61), Brent Moore (#96), Jason Hedlesky (#72), Butch Jarvis (#53), Dana White (#39), Dude Teate (#70)

Aaron's 312 (Atlanta)

The Aaron's 312 was held on October 25 at Atlanta Motor Speedway. Greg Biffle won the pole.

Top ten results

7–Greg Biffle
17–Matt Kenseth
25–Bobby Hamilton Jr.
99–Michael Waltrip
8–Hank Parker Jr.
10–Scott Riggs
38–Kasey Kahne
37–David Green
21–Kevin Harvick
31–Dave Blaney

Failed to qualify: John Hayden (#85), Jimmy Henderson (#63), Justin Ashburn (#61), Dwayne Leik (#81), Wayne Anderson (#35), Jeff Fuller (#91)

Bashas' Supermarkets 200

The Bashas' Supermarkets 200 was held on November 1 at Phoenix International Raceway. Kevin Harvick won the pole. The race was shortened to 181 laps due to rain.

Top ten results

25–Bobby Hamilton Jr.
21–Kevin Harvick
5–Brian Vickers
87–Joe Nemechek
10–Scott Riggs
23–Scott Wimmer
14–Casey Atwood
43–Johnny Sauter
7–Greg Biffle

Failed to qualify: Stan Boyd (#51), Blake Mallory (#39), Josh Richeson (#67), Jeff Fuller (#97), Randy MacDonald (#72), John Hayden (#85), Alfredo Tarne Jr. (#73), Jeff Streeter (#83), Clint Vahsholtz (#90)

This would be Hamilton’s 5th and final Busch Series win as well as his fourth of the season.
Hamilton's victory, along with point leader David Green's 17th place finish, tightened up the championship fight. With 2 races to go, 6 drivers were still in contention for the Busch Series crown, while 7th place Scott Wimmer was 502 out of the lead, and therefore mathematically ineligible.

Target House 200

The Target House 200 was held on November 8 at North Carolina Speedway. Brian Vickers won the pole.

Top ten results

1–Jamie McMurray
8–Martin Truex Jr.
25–Bobby Hamilton Jr.
79–Jeremy Mayfield
30–David Stremme
5–Brian Vickers
87–Kyle Busch
23–Scott Wimmer
43-Johnny Sauter
37–David Green

Failed to qualify: Josh Richeson (#67), Morgan Shepherd (#89), Rich Bickle (#94), Brad Teague (#52), Jason Schuler (#73), Justin Ashburn (#61), Caleb Holman (#78), Dion Ciccarelli (#84), Norm Benning (#81), Jerry Reary (#22), Justin Hobgood (#80)

The championship battle took on a new complexion going into Miami. After polesitter Brian Vickers led the opening 6 laps, none of the title contenders were a serious threat for the win, though all but Keller and Hornaday ran in the Top 10 in the first half of the race. Point leader Scott Riggs dropped from the Top 10 due to a loose condition, exacerbated by a long green flag run. Though he gained several spots in the pit cycle by coming in early, he slid into the wall on Lap 166 and ended his day in the garage in 38th. Hamilton rebounded with another Top 5, with Vickers and Green in the Top 10, Keller on the lead lap in 13th, and Hornaday, who never cracked the Top 10 all day, a lap down in 17th. All this left 20 year old Brian Vickers with a 22 point lead over 1994 champion David Green, with Riggs dropping from the lead to 5th, and 6th place Hamilton still in reasonable contention at 89 points out of the lead. Disregarding what any of his title challengers might do, Vickers would secure the championship if he could finish 3rd or better at Homestead.

Ford 300

The Ford 300 was held on November 15 at Homestead-Miami Speedway. Greg Biffle won the pole.

Top ten results

38–Kasey Kahne
8–Martin Truex Jr.
25–Bobby Hamilton Jr.
00–Jason Leffler
46–Ashton Lewis
21–Kevin Harvick
20–Mike Bliss
19–Casey Mears
37–David Green
99–Michael Waltrip

This was Kahne's first Busch series victory.
Failed to qualify: Morgan Shepherd (#9), Jason Schuler (#73), Clint Vahsholtz (#39), Justin Ashburn (#61), Mike Harmon (#44), Stan Boyd (#51), Joe Aramendia (#79), Brad Baker (#28)

Scott Riggs' championship hopes ended on the first lap, when he crashed in Turn 3 with teammate Jon Wood and the FitzBradshaw Racing duo of Casey Atwood and Tim Fedewa. Riggs' crew would repair the car, but he would only complete 28 laps before ending his day in 41st. Despite the disappointing end to 2003, he would look ahead to 2004 and the start of his Nextel Cup Series career with MBV Motorsports.
Two-time series runner-up Jason Keller was never a factor, and he finished a lap down in 24th. Ron Hornaday Jr finished 15th, leader Brian Vickers 11th, David Green 9th, and Bobby Hamilton Jr 3rd after leading 41 laps.
With Green only gaining 8 points on leader Vickers, the 20 year old from Thomasville, North Carolina won the Busch Series championship by 14 points. He was also the youngest series champion in history, breaking the record set by the late Rob Moroso, who was 21 when he overcame Tommy Houston for the 1989 NASCAR Busch Series title. Vickers, like Riggs, would be a candidate for 2004 Nextel Cup rookie of the year, graduating with Hendrick Motorsports. 18 year old Kyle Busch would take his place in the #5 Busch car for 2004.

Final points standings 

Brian Vickers – 4637
David Green – 4623
Ron Hornaday Jr. – 4591
Bobby Hamilton Jr. – 4588
Jason Keller – 4528
Scott Riggs – 4462
Kasey Kahne – 4104
Johnny Sauter – 4098
Scott Wimmer – 4059
Mike Bliss – 3932
Stacy Compton – 3893
Ashton Lewis – 3801
Mike Wallace – 3489
Coy Gibbs – 3213
Shane Hmiel – 3160
Kevin Harvick – 3077
Todd Bodine – 2763
Michael Waltrip – 2637
Kevin Grubb – 2498
Jamie McMurray – 2478
Larry Gunselman – 2371
David Stremme – 2354
Mike Harmon – 2207
Matt Kenseth – 1925
Stanton Barrett – 1877
Randy LaJoie – 1863
Kerry Earnhardt – 1767
Jason Schuler – 1765
Jason White – 1754
Joey Clanton – 1716
Joe Nemechek – 1704
Brad Teague – 1647
Chad Blount – 1581
Casey Mears – 1525
Greg Biffle – 1502
Tim Fedewa – 1491
Casey Atwood – 1422
Regan Smith – 1313
Tony Raines – 1230
Martin Truex Jr. – 1228
Chase Montgomery – 1219
Ron Young – 1201
Dave Blaney – 1133
Hermie Sadler – 1066
Tammy Jo Kirk – 1062
Tim Sauter – 1028
Damon Lusk – 950
Kyle Busch – 827
Jay Sauter – 818
David Reutimann – 805

Full Drivers' Championship

(key) Bold – Pole position awarded by time. Italics – Pole position set by owner's points. * – Most laps led. ** - All laps led.

Rookie of the Year 

Despite not completing a full schedule and running for two different teams, David Stremme was named the 2003 Busch Series Rookie of the Year, posting three top-five finishes. Runner-up Coy Gibbs ran the full schedule and finished 14th in points, but did not accumulate enough rookie points to overtake Stremme. He would retire from racing at the end of the year. Third-place finisher Joey Clanton shared the #27 Brewco Motorsports ride with fellow rookie Chase Montgomery, while Chad Blount finished fourth running part-time with Braun and Carroll Racing. Regan Smith, Damon Lusk, and Chris Bingham were released from their rides during the season.

See also 
 2003 NASCAR Winston Cup Series
 2003 NASCAR Craftsman Truck Series

External links 
Busch Series Standings and Statistics for 2003

NASCAR Xfinity Series seasons